Rio Grande County is a county located in the U.S. state of Colorado. As of the 2020 census, the population was 11,539. The county seat is Del Norte. The county is named for the Rio Grande (Spanish language for "Big River"), which flows through the county.

Description
The gateway to the San Juan Mountains, Rio Grande County is one of the highlights of the San Luis Valley. There are three municipalities within the county, Monte Vista, Del Norte, and South Fork and all have been historically developed along the rail line that follows the Rio Grande.

Monte Vista is the county's largest community situated on the valley floor. "Monte", as locals call it, is the center of the agricultural aspect of the county. There are numerous festivals, events, and clubs that take place in and around Monte Vista, and the Monte Vista National Wildlife Refuge is a stop for migratory Sand Hill Cranes every year.
Del Norte is a quaint town with a focus on its historic past; it is the county seat, home to the Rio Grande County Museum, and maintains a historic façade in its main street.

The newest town in Rio Grande County is South Fork. South Fork is surrounded by the Rio Grande National Forest and other public lands and has easy access to Wolf Creek Ski Area. Developed as a logging center it has become a gem of the Valley with a booming housing market, world-class 18-hole golf course, and the distinction of being the "Gateway to the Silver Thread" scenic byway.

Geography

Adjacent counties
Saguache County - north
Alamosa County - east
Conejos County - south
Archuleta County - southwest
Mineral County - west

Major Highways
  U.S. Highway 160
  U.S. Highway 285
  State Highway 15
  State Highway 112
  State Highway 149
  State Highway 368
  State Highway 370

National protected areas
Monte Vista National Wildlife Refuge
Rio Grande National Forest

Trails and byways
Continental Divide National Scenic Trail
Old Spanish National Historic Trail
Silver Thread Scenic Byway

Demographics

At the 2000 census there were 12,413 people, 4,701 households, and 3,417 families living in the county.  The population density was 14 people per square mile (5/km2).  There were 6,003 housing units at an average density of 7 per square mile (3/km2).  The racial makeup of the county was 73.93% White, 0.35% Black or African American, 1.26% Native American, 0.23% Asian, 0.02% Pacific Islander, 21.45% from other races, and 2.76% from two or more races.  41.67% of the population were Hispanic or Latino of any race.
Of the 4,701 households 35.10% had children under the age of 18 living with them, 57.80% were married couples living together, 11.20% had a female householder with no husband present, and 27.30% were non-families. 24.10% of households were one person and 10.30% were one person aged 65 or older.  The average household size was 2.59 and the average family size was 3.08.

The age distribution was 28.10% under the age of 18, 8.00% from 18 to 24, 25.30% from 25 to 44, 23.90% from 45 to 64, and 14.70% 65 or older.  The median age was 37 years. For every 100 females there were 97.10 males.  For every 100 females age 18 and over, there were 94.40 males.

The median household income was $31,836 and the median family income was $36,809. Males had a median income of $30,432 versus $23,005 for females. The per capita income for the county was $15,650.  About 11.30% of families and 14.50% of the population were below the poverty line, including 18.40% of those under age 18 and 11.20% of those age 65 or over.

Politics

Communities

City
Monte Vista

Towns
Center
Del Norte
South Fork

Census-designated places 
Alpine
Gerrard

Unincorporated
Homelake

See also

Outline of Colorado
Index of Colorado-related articles
National Register of Historic Places listings in Rio Grande County, Colorado

References

External links
Rio Grande County Government website
Colorado County Evolution by Don Stanwyck
Colorado Historical Society

 
Colorado counties
1874 establishments in Colorado Territory
San Luis Valley of Colorado
Populated places established in 1874